Red tape is a term describing bureaucratic regulation or standards claimed to be excessive.

Red tape or Red Tape may also refer to:

 "Red Tape" (song), a song by French singer Amanda Lear
 "Red Tape," a song by American hardcore punk group Circle Jerks
 Red Tape (album), an album by American southern rock band Atlanta Rhythm Section
 "Red Tape", a tape of prank calls to New Jersey bartender Louis "Red" Deutsch 
 Red Tape, an album by Canadian rap group Social Deviantz
 Redtape Magazine, published in New York from 1982 to 1990